Luis Wenceslao Astorquia Landabaso (4 October 1883 - 28 March 1963) was a Spanish footballer who played as a goalkeeper for Athletic Club. His older brother, Juan Astorquia, was the fundamental head behind the foundation of Athletic in 1898.

Biography
Born in Bilbao, he studied in England as a child, where he developed a deep interest in football. He also studied and played football in Mittweida, Germany, where he stood out as an outstanding goalkeeper. His older brother was a founding member of Athletic Club in 1898, but the club was not officially established until 5 September 1901, in the infamous meeting held in the Café García, in which Luis was one of the 33 socios (co-founders) of the club.

While his brother was a member of the first great team in the history of Athletic which won the 1902 Copa de la Coronación and the 1903 Copa del Rey, Luis was a member of the second great team which won two back-to-back Copa del Rey titles in 1910, 1911. He was the starting goalkeeper in both finals, keeping a clean sheet on the former in a 1–0 win over Vasconia. In his time at Athletic, he played five competitive matches, in which he conceded just two goals.

Honours
Copa del Rey: 1910 and 1911

References

1883 births
1967 deaths
Spanish footballers
Athletic Bilbao footballers
Footballers from Bilbao
Association football goalkeepers